The 1949 FA Cup final was the 68th final of the FA Cup. It took place on 30 April 1949 at Wembley Stadium and was contested between Wolverhampton Wanderers and Leicester City. Wolves had finished sixth in the First Division that season and had several England internationals among their ranks, while Leicester had narrowly avoided relegation from the Second Division and were making their first Wembley appearance.

Wolves won the match 3–1, thus winning the FA Cup for the third time. Jesse Pye (2) and Sammy Smyth scored Wolves' goals, with Mal Griffiths replying for Leicester. Captain Billy Wright was presented with the cup by Princess Elizabeth.

Road to Wembley

Leicester City

Wolverhampton Wanderers

Match summary
Wolves started determinedly and took a 13th-minute lead when Jesse Pye, who had been preferred to Dennis Wilshaw, stooped to head in an inch-perfect Hancocks cross. Leicester kept Wolves at bay until almost half-time, when Pye collected the ball in the penalty area with his back to goal, after the Foxes had struggled to clear a corner, and turned to slam it home for his second.

Leicester brought the game to life immediately after the interval courtesy of Mal Griffiths, who flicked the ball home after Williams parried Chisholm's initial effort. Within minutes, they believed they were level only for a narrow offside decision to rule out Chisholm's finish. Sammy Smyth quickly turned the game around when he picked up the ball in the centre circle and drove through the Leicester defence before hitting the ball low into the far corner to make it 3–1 and clinch the cup for Molineux men for the third time in their history. It was the first of five major trophies that they would win under the management of Stan Cullis.

Leicester were without two of their key players for the game, both of them ruled out by injury. Goalkeeper Ian McGraw was unable to play due to a broken finger, while Don Revie had suffered a nose injury.

Match details

References

External links
Match report

FA Cup Final
FA Cup Finals
FA Cup Final 1949
FA Cup Final 1949
FA Cup Final
FA Cup Final